The 2020–21 FA Cup was the 140th edition of the oldest football tournament in the world, the Football Association Challenge Cup. It was sponsored by Emirates and known as the Emirates FA Cup for sponsorship purposes. The winners qualified for the 2021–22 UEFA Europa League group stage.

Premier League side Arsenal were the defending champions, but were eliminated in the fourth round by Southampton.

Leicester City beat the defending runners-up Chelsea 1–0 in the final to win their first FA Cup, having been runners-up on four previous occasions.

Teams
The FA Cup is a knockout competition with 124 teams taking part all trying to reach the Final at Wembley in May 2021. The competition consisted of the 92 teams from the Football League system (20 teams from the Premier League and the 72 in total from the EFL Championship, EFL League One and EFL League Two) plus the 32 surviving teams out of 644 teams from the National League System (levels 5–10 of the English football league system) that started the competition in qualifying rounds.

All rounds were drawn randomly usually either at the completion of the previous round or on the evening of the last televised game of a round being played depending on television broadcasting rights.

This year's competition was subject to changes to the rules and round dates at short notice to follow the latest national and local government guidelines regarding the COVID-19 pandemic in the United Kingdom.

Delay and scheduling
As a result of the COVID-19 pandemic in the United Kingdom, the previous season's competition was delayed, with the final played roughly three months late, on 1 August 2020. In a normal year, the FA Cup would start in early August, but with the previous season finishing late, the start of the 2020–21 FA Cup was also delayed to 31 August 2020.

Contrary to initial speculation that the 2020–21 FA Cup would be reduced in size, on 25 July 2020, the FA confirmed that lower league teams would be able to compete in the competition, with 737 teams accepted (out of 889 entrants), actually representing an increase of two teams on the previous season. Following the liquidation of Macclesfield Town, 736 teams ultimately entered the competition.

All eligible teams at step 5 of the National League System (and above) were accepted into the competition, with the remaining places given to clubs at step 6. In previous seasons step 6 clubs have been given access to the Extra Preliminary Round based on their league position, but due to the cancellation of these leagues in 2019–20, the places for these teams was allocated by a random draw instead.

Round and draw dates
Planned dates for the early qualifying rounds were released to clubs in the National League System in late July, and confirmed by the FA on 3 August 2020. With replays removed from all rounds, some qualifying rounds were scheduled for Tuesdays rather than the usual Saturday.

Rules changes
To fit into a truncated schedule for the 2020–21 season, replays were removed entirely from the competition. The prize fund was reduced, with figures returning to those last used in the 2017–18 FA Cup. While restrictions on fans attending games in person were in place, the usual prize money awarded to the winners for each round was split 75% to 25% with the losers.

Qualifying rounds

Teams that were not members of either the Premier League or English Football League competed in the qualifying rounds to secure one of 32 available places in the First Round Proper. The qualifying competition began with the Extra Preliminary Round on 31 August 2020.

First Round Proper
The draw for the First Round Proper was held on 26 October 2020. The 31 winners from the fourth qualifying round joined the clubs from League One and League Two and bye recipients Chorley in 40 ties played over the weekend of 7 November. This round included one team from level 9, Skelmersdale United, the lowest ranked team left in the competition. Chesterfield were originally drawn to play at Rochdale in this round. However, due to Chesterfield fielding an ineligible player during their Fourth Qualifying Round match against Stockport County, the match was replayed and ultimately won by Stockport County.

Second Round Proper
The draw for the Second Round Proper was held on 9 November 2020. The 40 winners from the First Round Proper competed in 20 ties played over the weekend of 28 November. This round included two teams from level 8, Canvey Island and Marine, the lowest ranked teams left in the competition.

Third Round Proper
The draw for the Third Round Proper was held on 30 November 2020.
The 20 winners from the Second Round Proper joined the clubs from the Premier League and EFL Championship in 32 ties played over the weekend of 9 January 2021. This round included one team from level 8, Marine, the lowest ranked team left in the competition. Marine were drawn against Premier League club Tottenham Hotspur, representing the biggest league position gap between two teams in the competition's history.

Fourth Round Proper
The draw for the Fourth Round Proper was held on 11 January 2021, right before the Fifth Round Proper draw. The 32 winners from the Third Round Proper played in 16 ties over the weekend of 23 January 2021. This round included one team from level 6, Chorley, the lowest ranked and the only non-league team left in the competition.

Fifth Round Proper
The draw for the Fifth Round Proper was held on 11 January 2021, immediately after the Fourth Round Proper draw. The 16 winners from the Fourth Round Proper played in eight ties in midweek during the week commencing Monday 8 February 2021.

The round featured 12 teams from the Premier League (level 1) and four from the EFL Championship (level 2).

Quarter-finals
The draw for the quarter-finals was held on 11 February 2021, before the match between Barnsley and Chelsea. The eight winners from the Fifth Round Proper play in four ties played on the weekend of 20 March 2021.

The round featured seven teams from the Premier League (level 1) and one from the EFL Championship (level 2). Bournemouth were the only non-top flight team to play in this round.

Semi-finals
The draw for the semi-finals was held on 21 March 2021, at half-time of the match between Leicester City and Manchester United. The four winners from the quarter-finals played in two ties at Wembley Stadium on 17 and 18 April 2021.

The round featured four teams from the Premier League (level 1).

Final

Top scorers

Television rights

A number of games per round also aired on BT Sport and BBC digital platforms, BT Sport Extra, and the FA Player. For the first time, all matches in the Third and Fourth Rounds Proper were aired live in the UK.

Prize fund

Notes

References

 
FA Cup seasons
FA Cup
FA Cup